Siadougou is a commune in the Cercle of San in the Ségou Region of Mali. The principal town lies at Siella. In 1998 the commune had a population of 10,294.

References

Communes of Ségou Region